Oenanthe can refer to:

Taxonomy
Oenanthe (bird), a genus of birds in the family Muscicapidae
Oenanthe (plant), a genus of plants in the family Apiaceae

Persons
 Oenanthe of Egypt (flourished 3rd century BC), Egyptian Greek noblewoman and the wife of Agathocles